The 2020 North Carolina Tar Heels football team represented the University of North Carolina at Chapel Hill as a member of the Atlantic Coast Conference (ACC) during the 2020 NCAA Division I FBS football season. The Tar Heels were led by head coach Mack Brown, in the second season of his second stint at North Carolina and his 12th overall season. The team played their home games at Kenan Memorial Stadium and competed.

Building on the momentum from the first season of Brown's return to Chapel Hill, the Tar Heels finished in a three-way tie for third place in the ACC. Divisional play had been suspended due to the COVID-19 pandemic. With Clemson and Notre Dame selected for the College Football Playoff, the Tar Heels received a bid to the Orange Bowl, their first appearance in a major bowl since 1949.

Personnel

Coaching staff

Roster

Schedule
North Carolina had games scheduled against Auburn, James Madison, UConn and UCF, which were all canceled due to the COVID-19 pandemic. On September 17, Charlotte announced the game at North Carolina scheduled for September 19 was canceled due to the impact that contact tracing quarantine had on a key position group. Several members of the Charlotte offensive line were placed into quarantine following the University's COVID-19 contact tracing protocols, effectively depleting that unit. On November 16, it was announced that the games with Miami and Western Carolina would be swapped due to COVID-19 issues with the Hurricanes. The Tar Heels will play the Catamounts on December 5 and Miami a week later on December 12.

The ACC released their schedule on July 29, with specific dates selected at a later date.

Rankings

Game summaries

Syracuse

at Boston College

Virginia Tech

at Florida State

NC State

at Virginia

at Duke

Wake Forest

Notre Dame

Western Carolina

at Miami (FL)

vs. Texas A&M (Orange Bowl)

Players drafted into the NFL

References

North Carolina
North Carolina Tar Heels football seasons
North Carolina Tar Heels football